Dare to Be Surprised is the second studio album by the Folk Implosion. It was released on Communion in 1997.

Production
The liner notes state that the album was "recorded at Bliss onto videotape, 8-16 tracks," and that "no analog equipment was used in the production of this record (except for a couple of things)."

Critical reception

Stephen Thomas Erlewine of AllMusic called the album "one of the finest items in their respective catalogs." Mark Binelli of Spin commented that "the record feels frigid, less a true attempt at seduction than a tepid toe-suck."

Track listing

Personnel
Credits adapted from liner notes.

The Folk Implosion
 Lou Barlow – bass guitar, drums, instruments, vocals
 John Davis – guitar, drums, instruments, vocals

Additional personnel
 Wally Gagel – drum programming, recording, engineering, mixing
 Gary Weissman – artwork, layout
 Tamara Bonn – photography
 JJ Gifford – digital manipulation

References

External links
 
The Folk Implosion discography

1997 albums
The Folk Implosion albums